The Canton of Ourville-en-Caux is a former canton situated in the Seine-Maritime département and in the Haute-Normandie region of northern France. It was disbanded following the French canton reorganisation which came into effect in March 2015. It had a total of 5,177 inhabitants (2012).

Geography 
An area of farming and light industry in the arrondissement of Le Havre, centred on the town of Ourville-en-Caux. The altitude varies from 36m (Le Hanouard) to 152m (Anvéville) with an average altitude of 105m.

The canton comprised 16 communes:

Ancourteville-sur-Héricourt
Anvéville
Beuzeville-la-Guérard
Carville-Pot-de-Fer
Cleuville
Le Hanouard
Hautot-l'Auvray
Héricourt-en-Caux
Oherville
Ourville-en-Caux
Robertot
Routes
Saint-Vaast-Dieppedalle
Sommesnil
Thiouville
Veauville-lès-Quelles

Population

See also 
 Arrondissements of the Seine-Maritime department
 Cantons of the Seine-Maritime department
 Communes of the Seine-Maritime department

References

Ourville-en-Caux
2015 disestablishments in France
States and territories disestablished in 2015